Marianne Gustafsson (25 February 1913 – 13 November 1999) was a Swedish swimmer. She competed in the women's 200 metre breaststroke event at the 1928 Summer Olympics.

References

External links
 

1913 births
1999 deaths
Olympic swimmers of Sweden
Swimmers at the 1928 Summer Olympics
People from Eskilstuna
Swedish female breaststroke swimmers
Sportspeople from Södermanland County
20th-century Swedish women